Beginning in 2017, USA Curling began a U18 National Championship to further promote the sport of curling.  Teams qualify through the a regional playdown process, utilizing USCA 10 geographic regions.  The U18 Nationals is also one of USCA twelve National Championship events.   

Eligibility 

Any player who is less than 18 years of age at any time during the 30th day of June of the year immediately preceding the year the competition is to take place, and is a resident (no minimum residency required) of the United States as of registration deadline. All players must be members of a USCA member club within the registered region.

Past Champions

Women:

Men:

References 

USA Curling U18 Championships: Scores

USA Curling U18 Championships: Scores

CURLING: Bemidji natives Yavarow, Ritchie win curling national title

Poynette 2017: A year in review | Poynette Press | hngnews.com

A Bemidji sweep: Yavarow, Fenson rinks claim titles at USA Curling U18 Nationals

Curling competitions in the United States
Curling
National youth sports competitions